Willie Christine King Farris (born September 11, 1927) is the eldest sibling of Martin Luther King Jr. She taught at Spelman College and is the author of several books and was a public speaker on various topics, including the King family, multicultural education, and teaching.

Education and career
Like her mother and grandmother before her, Farris attended Spelman College in Atlanta, where she received a Bachelor's degree in Economics in 1948. She wanted to continue her studies at the University of Georgia but it did not admit Black students at the time. Farris then attended Columbia University in New York and received a Master's degree in Social Foundations of Education in 1950. She earned a second master's degree in Special Education in 1958.

Farris got her first professional job as a teacher at W.H. Crogman Elementary School, Atlanta, in 1950. The school primarily served students from black low-income households. She returned to Spelman as director of the Freshman Reading Program in 1958. Farris held a tenured professorship in Education and was Director of the Learning Resources Center for 48 years before retiring in 2014.

Farris was, for many years, Vice Chair and Treasurer of the King Center for Nonviolent Social Change and had been active for several years in the International Reading Association, and various church and civic organizations, including the National Association for the Advancement of Colored People and the Southern Christian Leadership Conference.  Farris has also published a children's book, My Brother Martin, as well as the autobiography, Through It All: Reflections on My Life, My Family, and My Faith.

Family 
Farris was the first child and only daughter of Rev. Martin Luther King Sr. and Alberta Williams King, and is the elder sister of Rev. Martin Luther King Jr. and A. D. King. The three siblings spent their early years in the home of their grandfather, Adam Daniel Williams, who died on March 21, 1931. She married Isaac Newton Farris Sr. on August 19, 1960. They had two children: Isaac Newton Farris Jr., and Angela Christine Farris Watkins.

Family tragedies 
Farris endured the 1968 assassination of brother Martin, the 1969 accidental drowning of brother A. D., and the 1974 assassination of her mother. Farris did not return to Memphis, Tennessee, since traveling there after her brother's assassination to retrieve his body. In recent years, she attended the funerals of sister-in-law, Coretta Scott King (died January 30, 2006) and niece Yolanda King (died May 15, 2007). In an interview with CNN, she said she would not attend an April 2008 event marking the 40th anniversary of her brother's assassination, because the painful memories of her last visit to Memphis still haunted her. Her husband, Isaac Newton Farris Sr., died on December 30, 2017, at the age of 83.

References

External links 

Christine Farris Bio at Spelman College
King Encyclopedia Stanford University
Young MLK The Tavis Smiley Show, January 15, 2003
 Education Update Interview with Christine King Farris
Honoring Willie Christine King Farris' 80th Birthday
Washington Informer

Christine Farris visits The Latin School
TIME for Kids Interview
CNN: Sister remembers 'horrible moment' King was killed
Farris, Willie Christine King, "The Young Martin: From Childhood Through College", Ebony, January 1986.

1927 births
Activists from Georgia (U.S. state)
American civil rights activists
Baptists from Georgia (U.S. state)
Columbia University alumni
Living people
Writers from Atlanta
Spelman College alumni
Spelman College faculty
Christine King Farris